David Biale is an American historian specializing in Jewish history.

Biale earned a degree in history from the University of California, Berkeley in 1971, and remained at the institution to complete a master's degree in modern European history in 1972. During his doctoral studies, Biale specialized in Jewish history, and obtained a Ph.D. in the subject from the University of California, Los Angeles in 1977. Between 1986 and 1999, Biale was the Koret Professor of Jewish History and director of the Center for Jewish Studies at the Graduate Theological Union. He subsequently joined the University of California, Davis, as Emanuel Ringelblum Distinguished Professor of Jewish History. Biale received a Guggenhem fellowship in 1999.

References

1949 births
Living people
20th-century American historians
21st-century American historians
Historians of Jews and Judaism
American historians of religion
University of California, Los Angeles alumni
University of California, Davis faculty
University of California, Berkeley alumni
20th-century American male writers
21st-century American male writers
Historians from California